Qaleh Rash (also Romanized as Qal'eh Rash; also known as Qal’eh Rasheh and Qal‘eh-ye Rasheh) is a village in Baryaji Rural District, in the Central District of Sardasht County, West Azerbaijan Province, Iran. At the 2006 census, its population was 1,140, in 233 families.

References 

Populated places in Sardasht County